Saint-Valery-en-Caux is a former railway station in Saint-Valery-en-Caux, Upper Normandy, France. The station was located on the former Motteville to Saint-Valéry-en-Caux railway. Trains ceased using the station in 1996, but as is often the case in France, the ticket office remained open for parcels and tickets for the rail replacement buses. The station was served by train services between Rouen and Saint-Valery-en-Caux.

References

External links

Defunct railway stations in Seine-Maritime
Railway stations closed in 1996
1996 disestablishments in France